Rosemary A. Bailey  (born 1947) is a British statistician who works in the design of experiments and the analysis of variance and in related areas of combinatorial design, especially in association schemes. She has written books on the design of experiments, on association schemes, and on linear models in statistics.

Education and career
Bailey's first degree and  Ph.D. were in mathematics at the University of Oxford. She was awarded her doctorate in 1974 for a dissertation on permutation groups, Finite Permutation Groups supervised by Graham Higman. Bailey's career has not been in pure mathematics but in statistics where she has specialised in the algebraic problems associated with the design of experiments.

Bailey worked at the University of Edinburgh with David Finney and at The Open University. She spent 1981–91 in the Statistics Department of Rothamsted Experimental Station. In 1991 Bailey became Professor of Mathematical Sciences at Goldsmiths College in the University of London and then Professor of Statistics at Queen Mary, University of London where she is Professor Emerita of Statistics. She is currently Professor of Mathematics and Statistics in the School of Mathematics and Statistics at the University of St Andrews, Scotland.

Recognition
Bailey is a Fellow of the Institute of Mathematical Statistics and in 2015 was elected a Fellow of the Royal Society of Edinburgh.

Selected publications

References

External links
 Homepage of Professor Bailey at Queen Mary University of London
 Homepage of Professor Bailey at the School of Mathematics and Statistics, University of St Andrews
 R.A. Bailey at theoremoftheday.org

20th-century English mathematicians
21st-century English mathematicians
Academics of Queen Mary University of London
Algebraists
Alumni of St Hugh's College, Oxford
Combinatorialists
English statisticians
Living people
Rothamsted statisticians
British women mathematicians
Women statisticians
1947 births
Academics of the University of St Andrews
Fellows of the Institute of Mathematical Statistics
Fellows of the Royal Society of Edinburgh
20th-century women mathematicians
21st-century women mathematicians